The 2017 NRL season was the 110th season of professional rugby league in Australia and the 20th season run by the National Rugby League. The season started in New Zealand with the annual Auckland Nines, and was followed by the All Stars Match, which was played at McDonald Jones Stadium in Newcastle, and the World Club Series. It marked the last time that the Anzac Test and City vs. Country representative matches were played.

Teams

The lineup of teams remained unchanged for the 11th consecutive year.

Pre-season

The 2017 pre-season featured the fourth edition of the Auckland Nines competition, held over a weekend at Auckland's Eden Park in which the Sydney Roosters defeated the Penrith Panthers in the final. The All Stars match was held on February 10 at McDonald Jones Stadium in Newcastle. The 2017 World Club Series took place in England with the Super League champions Wigan Warriors defeating the NRL premiers Cronulla-Sutherland Sharks in the World Club Challenge match.

Regular season

Bold – Opposition's Home game
X – Bye
* – Golden point game
Opponent for round listed above margin

Ladder

Ladder progression
Numbers highlighted in green indicate that the team finished the round inside the top 8.
Numbers highlighted in blue indicates the team finished first on the ladder in that round.
Numbers highlighted in red indicates the team finished last place on the ladder in that round.
Underlined numbers indicate that the team had a bye during that round.

Finals series

† Match decided in extra time.

Chart

Grand Final

Player statistics and records
 Cameron Smith became the most prolific goal kicker in NRL history when he kicked his 943rd goal in Round 9. During the Finals he surpassed Darren Lockyer as the most capped player in NRL history with his 356th game and became the first player to kick 1,000 NRL goals.
 Nathan Cleary, 19, broke the record for the youngest player to score 200 points in a season which was set by Graham Eadie, 20, in 1974. Cleary also became the youngest player to be the season's leading points scorer since Harold Horder in 1913.
 Kirisome Auva'a scored the fastest try in NRL history in 13 seconds for Parramatta Eels against Brisbane Broncos in Round 25.

The following statistics are as of the conclusion of Round 26.

Top 5 point scorers

Top 5 try scorers

Top 5 goal scorers

Top 5 tacklers

2017 Transfers

Players

Source:

Coaches

References